Otto Brusatti (born 29 June 1948) is an Austrian radio personality and musicologist. He has also made a name for himself as an author, director and exhibition organizer.

Life 
Born in Zell am See, Brusatti grew up in Baden near Vienna. The son of a couple of professors, Brusatti first aspired to a university career. He studied musicology, history and philosophy and worked in Germany for the WDR. At the beginning of the 80s he returned to ORF and began to host the morning show Pasticcio on Ö1, which he still does today. The programme always includes a riddle for the listeners. Brusatti's last classical music meeting point was on 9 September 2017.

Brusatti always presents his shows live without notes and tries to confront his guests with unconventional questions. He also moderates the programmes Apropos Classical and Tonart, presents European Broadcasting Union live concerts, designs major programmes and tries to familiarise his audience with classical music. His first major project was a spoken opera with Will Quadflieg after Gustav Mahler's Symphony No. 3

In 1975, with the protection of the later suspended head of the collection Ernst Hilmar, he was employed in the music collection of the then Wienbibliothek im Rathaus, where he co-organized exhibitions on composers such as Schubert and Mozart, but often took leave of absence for his various extra-professional projects. Brusatti also taught comparative aesthetics at the University of Vienna for several years and worked at the Vienna Burgtheater. He publishes popular science books as well as fiction, poetry and radio plays. He directed ORF productions on the occasion of the Mozart and Sigmund Freud Years.

Since 2008 Brusatti has been retired.

Work 
 Joseph Lanner (2001)
 Dreimalneunmalleben (2002)
 Josef Strauss – Delirien und Sphärenklänge. (2002)
 Wien, Musik – Eros & Thanatos. (2003)
 Jazik. Eine dalmatinische Novelle. (2004)
 Mozart auf der Reise nach Berlin. Mitteldeutscher Verlag, Halle (Saale) 2005, 
 Fest auf A. Ein Franz Schubert Roman. Mitteldeutscher Verlag, Halle (Saale) 2013, 
 Im Jahr der Sünden. Eine Novelle über ein geschlitztes Abendkleid, ein Kinderlied, den Tod und zu viele Nonnen. Mitteldeutscher Verlag, Halle (Saale) 2014, 
 Das musikalische Opfer. Form und Stimmungen.Mitteldeutscher Verlag, Halle (Saale) 2015, 
 34 – der einfache Schrecken oder die Welt heute … Ein schmaler Roman zwischen Dresden und Wien. Mitteldeutscher Verlag, Halle (Saale) 2017,

Radio plays 
 1984: Die letzten Stunden der Menschheit – director: Otto Brusatti (ORF/WDR)

References

External links 
 

Austrian radio presenters
Austrian musicologists
21st-century musicologists
Austrian radio writers
1948 births
Living people
People from Zell am See